The men's triple jump event  at the 1985 European Athletics Indoor Championships was held on 2 March.

Results

References

Triple jump at the European Athletics Indoor Championships
Triple